Fedikovella is a genus of sea snails, deep-sea limpets, marine gastropod mollusks in the family Cocculinidae.

Species
Species within the genus Fedikovella include:

 Fedikovella beanii (Dall, 1882)
 Fedikovella caymanensis Moskalev, 1976

References

External links

Cocculinidae
Gastropod genera